Chaft-e Kola (also Romanized as Chaft-e Kolā; also known as Chāfteh Kolā) is a village in Balatajan Rural District, in the Central District of Qaem Shahr County, Mazandaran Province, Iran. At the 2006 census, its population was 778, in 188 families.

References 

Populated places in Qaem Shahr County